Aksenikha is a rural locality (a village) in Ivanovskoye Rural Settlement, Kovrovsky District, Vladimir Oblast, Russia. The population was 98 as of 2010. There are 3 streets.

Geography 
Aksenikha is located on the left bank of the Kestromka River, 46 km south of Kovrov (the district's administrative centre) by road. Otrub is the nearest rural locality.

References 

Rural localities in Kovrovsky District